Yukteshwar Kumar (born 7 August 1970) is an Indian sinologist, born and brought up in Jagdispur. An alumnus of Jawaharlal Nehru University, he taught from 1994 at Visva-Bharati University, Santiniketan, where he obtained his Ph.D. in 2002. Earlier, he also taught at Jawaharlal Nehru University, New Delhi, and worked at All India Radio.

After this he taught at Delhi University as Reader/Associate Professor in Chinese. He currently is Course Director of the Chinese Stream at the University of Bath. Kumar has authored several articles and books. He has provided opinion pieces and news items for Indian, Chinese, and British media including the BBC.

Politics
In the 2015 local elections, Kumar stood in Lambridge ward but failed to attract enough support to get elected, ultimately coming in fourth behind the Green Party, the Conservative Party, and another Liberal Democrat candidate.

Determined to become a Councillor, Kumar stood in the 2019 local elections and came second in the Bathwick ward poll, which resulted in his election as a member of Bath and North East Somerset Council for the Liberal Democrats.

In September 2020, Kumar was voted as the most influential person in Bath through an online voting system.

In May 2021, Kumar was appointed deputy mayor of the city of Bath. He is the first person of Asian heritage to take the role of deputy mayor of Bath.

Controversies
On 30 December 2021, Kumar resigned from the Liberal Democrats, writing on social media that for the past three years he has endured "bullies", "manipulative lies" and "discrimination" from within the local party, and that he would instead stand as an Independent councillor for Bathwick.

These claims were strongly refuted by the Liberal Democrats who said that Kumar had been warned about his behaviour towards a female councillor on a number of occasions and, after he wrote that he was “thankful to God that perhaps he has chosen me to eradicate an evil person”, the party had chosen to contact the police.

Kumar has accepted he said these words, but claims that they were misunderstood  and should not have been interpreted as a death threat. The police have confirmed they advised the female colleague on home security to ensure she felt safe.

In July 2022 Kumar joined the Conservative group on Bath and North East Somerset Council.

Media commentator

Kumar is often called by the Indian, British and Chinese media to appear on television and provide opinion on matters related with China and Chinese culture.

References

External links
 Yukteshwar Kumar  website

1970 births
Living people
Indian sinologists
Writers from Delhi
People associated with Santiniketan
Jawaharlal Nehru University alumni
Visva-Bharati University alumni
Academic staff of Jawaharlal Nehru University
Academic staff of Delhi University
Academics of the University of Bath
Liberal Democrats (UK) councillors
Councillors in Somerset
Conservative Party (UK) councillors